Nathaniel Archibald may refer to:

Nathaniel Archibald (basketball, born 1952) (1952–2018), American college basketball player at Alcorn State
Nate Archibald (born 1948), American professional basketball player inducted into Naismith Memorial Basketball Hall of Fame
Nate Archibald (Gossip Girl), fictional character in the best-selling book series